"Have You Ever?" is a song by American recording artist Brandy Norwood for her second studio album, Never Say Never (1998). The song was written by Diane Warren, while production was handled by David Foster. It was released as the album's third single by Atlantic Records in October 1998. The song became Norwood's second song to reach the top position on the US Billboard Hot 100, following the worldwide chart-topping of "The Boy Is Mine". The former further reached number one in New Zealand, number two in Iceland, number eight in Australia and the top 30 in Canada, Ireland, and the United Kingdom.

The song's music video, directed by Kevin Bray, depicts Norwood looking after the empty house of her best friend, whom she is secretly in love with, waiting for his return while she watches the videos of the two of them. At the 1999 MTV Video Music Awards, the video was nominated for Best R&B Video, but eventually lost to Lauryn Hill's "Doo Wop (That Thing)". The visual was a great success on the music video channels BET and MTV, where it reached fourth and third place, respectively. Following the release of the song, Norwood performed it on several televised programs, including the American Music Awards of 1999, The Tonight Show with Jay Leno and VH1 Divas 1999. After the release, "Have You Ever?" was later included frequently on the setlists for the singer's concerts and tours, including Never Say Never World Tour and the Human World Tour.

Background and recording

In 1997, Norwood began work on her second studio album Never Say Never, which served as a sequel to her platinum-selling self-titled debut album (1994). For Never Say Never, Norwood chose to work with other music producers, as she wanted to create more adult material, being partly inspired by her idols, Whitney Houston and Mariah Carey. She had greater creative control than on the previous album and became one of the lead producers for the project.

"Have You Ever?" was written by Diane Warren, and while produced by David Foster. While Norwood had worked with a wide range of different producers on previous tracks for her debut album and several soundtrack contributions, the recording of the song marked the first time she "had been in the studio with a producer like David Foster", Norwood stated in a 2005 interview. "My voice wasn't as developed as it is now and the song required what producers call 'money notes' — the kind that get you a No. 1 on the charts! I was really nervous but it all worked just fine." On September 5, 2012, Warren revealed in an interview that she considers the track "a classic song. She sang it amazingly. I'm still waiting for the country version. "Have You Ever?" was recorded at Chartmaker Studios in Malibu, California and at The Record Plant in Hollywood, California.

Prior to the collaboration with Norwood, Foster listened to her previous music and especially focused on "Sittin' Up in My Room" from 1995. He was inspired by the background singing on the song and wanted to find the person who created it. "I really liked those background vocals. I wanted to get the same person to do them on our song, so I asked who it was and I found out it was all Brandy. I couldn't believe it!" Foster continued: "I have to say, I have never worked with anyone who can do backgrounds so easily." Norwood had arranged and recorded the background vocals for "Have You Ever" in less than two hours.

In 2005, when "Have You Ever?" was included on her first compilation album The Best of Brandy, Norwood recounted the recording of the song: "It was the first time I was in a recording studio with David Foster. In an interview with Complex, she elaborated on the recording process: "It did not take so many shots but they definitely took over a few times to have some to choose from. But again, I admired these people so immensely. I think it helped me, because I wanted to do well. "I wanted to impress them. So I tried everything possible. I was not afraid to be ashamed, I have never been. Sometimes my voice broke and I missed tones but I tried."

Composition and lyrics

According to the sheet music published at Musicnotes.com, the song is set in the time signature of common time and has a tempo of 72 beats per minute. The song was written in the key of A major, and Norwood's voice ranges from the tone of F and D. According to Rolanje D. Armstead of the TimesDaily, it has a "low-pitched, beat-based tune" consisting of keyboards and guitars. Music journalist, Chuck Taylor from Billboard considered "Have You Ever?" to be Norwood's "restrained song," which has a "searching and abandoned texture" that makes the listener understand she "draws emotions far from within herself.In the song's lyrics, Norwood sings about unrequited love with lyrics such as "Have you finally found the one you've given your heart to / Only to find that one will not give their heart to you.".

Release and critical reception
The release of the song as a single in the US by Atlantic Records. The song was met generally mixed reviews from music critics. In his single review for Billboard, journalist Chuck Taylor noted that it is hard "to imagine this single as anything but another jewel in the pop and Contemporary R&B princess' crown." He called the song's melody "instantly gratifying, with a harmony-soaked hook that's dedicated to memory after just a couple listens," and concluded that "Have You Ever?" is "a prime example of how, in the course of just a few short years, Brandy has proved to be one of the most versatile and promising stars on the fast real track to superstar royalty." Richard Harrington of The Spokesman-Review called the song a "luxurious [...] inevitable Diane Warren-penned power ballad," which was "begging to be redone as a duet, perhaps with Usher?"

In a generally negative review of Never Say Never, Angela Lewis of The Independent found that Norwood's "voice is pure honey, but she lacks real command of tracks like 'Have You Ever?', showing she's better at playing by the rules than anything else." Daryl Easlea of BBC Music wrote that [w]orking with session players the calibre of bassist Nathan East and David Foster on keyboards, Never Say Never was aimed at the widest audience possible. This was most evident on 'Have You Ever?'. She elaborated, writing that "the ballad sounds a little too formulaic and off-the-peg, aimed for the summit of the hit parade".  Grant Rindner of Oprah Magazine called that song is "slowburning and soulful throwback" and Norwood's voice sing in a "complex and knotted harmony."

Commercial performance
"Have You Ever?" debuted on the UK Singles Chart, at number 13 on the chart dated December 12, 1998. On January 9, 1999, Fred Bronson of Billboard announced that the commercial release had made the single climb from ninth to third place on the Billboard Hot 100 list with sales of 250,000 copies. The song reach the top position on the Billboard Hot 100 following the worldwide number-one success of "The Boy Is Mine."In the week of January 16, 1999, "Have You Ever?" reach the top 5 on Billboard 

The song also reached number one in New Zealand, peaked within the top ten in Australia, and managed to reach the top 30 in Canada and the United Kingdom and the top 30 in Ireland.

Music video

An accompanying music video was filmed by director Kevin Bray who in Los Angeles, California during the week of October 31, 1998. In the clip, Norwood looks after her best friend's empty house, waiting for his return while she watches videos of the two of them in the bedroom. In the first sequences of the video, Norwood drives into the driveway to the house and remains in the car as she gives up before the song's first verses. In other scenes, a video plays that sees Norwood hanging out with her love interest. The sequences alternate between scenes showing her in front of a pool, wearing the man's jacket. Norwood sits in his living room, walks around his closet, and dresses in his suit. Towards the end of the video, she sings to the man from a TV screen and performs the climax of the song in different clothes and in different places in the house. The video was brought to the attention of record label CEO, Clive Davis.
The music video became a success on America's largest music video channels. The video was sent to MTV and VH1 on October 10, 1998, and to BET the following week.  The visual entered at number 21 on BET's Video Top List that was released towards the weekend of October 24, 1998. The following week, "Have You Ever?" also on MTV in place 13. It reached the top ten on the list in early November 1998. On December 5, 1998, the video reached the third place on the list, which became its top position. "Have You Ever?" finally reached number four on BET's list on December 19, 1998, and number 14 on VH1's list on May 1, 1999. At the MTV Video Music Awards, held September 9, 1999, at the Metropolitan Opera House in New York, the song nominated in the category of Best R&B Video. However, it lost the award to Lauryn Hill's Doo Wop (That Thing).

Live performances
Norwood performed the song on several televised shows in the United States. On January 11, 1999, Norwood hosted the American Music Awards of 1999, where she was also nominated in two categories. During that evening, she performed "Have You Ever?" in a gold-colored evening dress while accompanied by an orchestra. Norwood also performed the song on the American talk show The Tonight Show with Jay Leno.  On April 13, 1999, the American gala, Divas Live '99 aired, where Norwood performed three songs from Never Say Never in a white evening gown. "Have You Ever?" was the opening number which after a few minutes turned into "Almost Doesn't Count" and then "(Everything I Do) I Do It for You".  The performance was seen by over nine million Americans and received a positive response from Jet magazine which described her performance of the song as "enchanting." The track was later included on the DVD of the same name. On May 16, 1999, Norwood performed the song in the TV movie Double Platinum, in which she played the lead role as the singer Kayla, daughter of the superstar Olivia King, played by Diana Ross. Since the release of "Have You Ever?," the song has often been included on the setlists for Norwood's concerts and tours, including the TV special, Brandy in Concert: A Special for the Holidays, which aired on American TV on November 20, 1999, and her two world tours Never Say Never World Tour and the Human World Tour.

Track listings

Credits and personnel
Credits are adapted from the liner notes of Never Say Never.
 Brandy Norwood  vocals, background vocals
 Diane Warren  writing
 David Foster  production, arrangement, keyboards
 Felipe Elgueta  sound engineering
 Mick Guzauski  sound mixing
 Tom Bender  assistant sound mixing
 Simon Franglen  Synclavier programming
 Michael Thompson  guitar

Charts

Weekly charts

Year-end charts

Certifications

Release history

Cover versions
 In 2003, American Idol finalist Trenyce, performed this song on the Final 6 Diane Warren show.  She eventually placed fifth in the competition.
 In 2006, Dutch singer Esmée Denters covered the song on YouTube, which led to her getting a record deal with Justin Timberlake's Tennman Records.
 On Australian Idol season 4 in 2006, eventual runner-up Jessica Mauboy performed Have You Ever on the Final 7 performance show.
 In 2007, Irish boy band Westlife remade a version of the song on their album Back Home
 In 2008, Filipino pop singer Nina Girado released her rendition of the song on her fourth studio album Nina Sings The Hits of Diane Warren
 In 2009, another Filipino pop singer Sarah Geronimo did a cover version of the song for seventh album Music and Me.
 In 2014, The X Factor contestant Stephanie Nala covered the song in the bottom two sing off.
 In 2019, Idols South Africa contestant Sneziey Msomi covered the song for the Top 7 show with the Love Songs theme.

References

Bibliography

External links
 ForeverBrandy.com — official site
 

Brandy Norwood songs
Billboard Hot 100 number-one singles
Number-one singles in New Zealand
Songs written by Diane Warren
Song recordings produced by David Foster
Contemporary R&B ballads
Music videos directed by Kevin Bray (director)
Soul ballads
Pop ballads
1990s ballads
Atlantic Records singles
Torch songs
1998 singles